Solbat may refer to:

 Lucas Solbat (born 1971), Papua New Guinean footballer
 Solbat Park station, train station in Seoul